Hammond Block (Budnick's Trading Mart) is a historic commercial building located at Indianapolis, Indiana.  It was built in 1874, and is a three-story, trapezoidal Italianate style red brick building on a limestone faced raised basement.  It has a low hipped roof with a broad eave with a panelled frieze and bracketed cornice. It features cast iron decorative elements.

It was listed on the National Register of Historic Places in 1979.

References

Commercial buildings on the National Register of Historic Places in Indiana
Italianate architecture in Indiana
Commercial buildings completed in 1874
Commercial buildings in Indianapolis
National Register of Historic Places in Indianapolis
1874 establishments in Indiana